El-Hadji Gana Kane (born 11 April 1995) is a Senegalese professional footballer who plays as a defender for KPV.

Career
Kane played in RCD Mallorca's academy between 2002 and 2014.

On 22 February 2016, Kane signed a one-year contract with Finnish Veikkausliiga side SJK.

Kane is represented by Djily Dieng of ExtraTime Sport Uk.

Transfer Fee Incident
In 2018 SJK received an unexpected bill of 80 000 euros for services of the player who played only in 8 matches. As his contract with SJK was his first professional contract, training compensation of 80 000 euros would have to be paid by SJK to three Spanish teams. In his previous team, he assumably had been salaried under the counter and his then salary of 1500 euros per month deceived the management of SJK to believe that there would not be such a large training compensation to be paid. The amount of 1500 euros was presented to SJK management by the representatives of the player, even though a different amount was registered to the official FIFA records. After falling victim to the scam, SJK begun to promote awareness for shady player transfer business practices.

References

External links
El-Hadji Gana Kane at Footballdatabase

1995 births
Living people
Senegalese footballers
Association football defenders
CD Binissalem players
Seinäjoen Jalkapallokerho players
Sandefjord Fotball players
Kokkolan Palloveikot players
Veikkausliiga players
Eliteserien players
Senegalese expatriate footballers
Expatriate footballers in Spain
Senegalese expatriate sportspeople in Spain
Expatriate footballers in Finland
Senegalese expatriate sportspeople in Finland
Expatriate footballers in Norway
Senegalese expatriate sportspeople in Norway